The High Commission of Canada in Australia is the diplomatic mission of Canada to Australia. It is located on Commonwealth Avenue, near State Circle, in the Australian capital city of Canberra. In addition to responsibility for bilateral relations between Canada and Australia, it is also responsible for relations with several Pacific Island nations, including the Marshall Islands, the Federated States of Micronesia, Nauru, Palau, Papua New Guinea, the Solomon Islands and Vanuatu.

History

Diplomatic relations between Canada and Australia were formally established in 1939, just as World War II broke out, with the appointment of high commissioners between the two nations. The three-storey chancery was officially opened January 30, 1964 by the Prime Minister of Australia, the Right Honourable Sir Robert Menzies. In 1994, the chancery was expanded to include a two-storey wing at the rear of the building. The new extension was opened by the Honourable Raymond Chan, Secretary of State (Asia-Pacific), on August 4, 1994. The High Commission currently has a complement of about 40-45 personnel, including Canada-based staff and locally engaged employees.

Since 1950 the High Commissioner's Official Residence has been an elegant mansion on Mugga Way in Canberra's historic Red Hill Conservation Area. The current High Commissioner is His Excellency Mr. Mark Glauser who was appointed on August 28, 2019.

The primary services offered at the High Commission in Canberra relate to helping companies do business with Canada, helping Canadian companies do business with Australia, furthering defence relations, and providing assistance to Canadians in the following Australian states: Victoria, Tasmania, South Australia, Western Australia and the Australian Capital Territory. It also provides development cooperation services for the Pacific Islands.

Canada also maintains a Consulate General in Sydney, NSW currently headed by Miss Angela Bogdan, with six Canada-based staff and 34 local employees. It is chiefly concerned with providing visa, immigration, and consular services for Canadians in the following states: New South Wales, Queensland and the Northern Territory. The mission has a much greater focus on cultural events given Sydney's national prominence in that sector.  Canada also has Honorary Consuls in Perth, WA, and Melbourne, VIC.

References

External links 
 Official site
 Canada-Pacific Islands bilateral relations

See also 
 Canadian-Australian relations
 Canada-New Zealand relations
 High Commission of Australia in Ottawa
 

1939 establishments in Australia
Australia–Canada relations
Canada
Canberra
Australia and the Commonwealth of Nations
Canada and the Commonwealth of Nations